Zannah Umar Mustapha (1966 – 15 August 2015) was a Nigerian politician who served as deputy governor of Borno State from 2011 until his death in 2015.

References

1966 births
2015 deaths
People from Borno State